George H. Bowen (30 April 1816 at Middlebury, Vermont – 5 February 1888 at Bombay, India) was an American missionary, newspaper man, linguist, and translator in India. He was known as "The White Saint of India" for his resemblance in manner and dress to the Hindu holy men.

Like many New Englanders of his generation Bowen was a skeptic, especially after reading the works of Edward Gibbon; however at the age of 28, in 1844, he grew into an acceptance of the Christian God upon reading William Paley's Natural Theology. Bowen subsequently enrolled in the Union Theological Seminary in New York and graduated from there in 1847. He went to India the next year as a missionary under the auspices of the American Board of Commissioners for Foreign Missions. Bowen became assistant editor in 1851 and edited and published the Bombay Guardian from 1854 until his death in 1888. Bowen was the director of the Bombay Tract and Book Society. Beginning in 1871, Bowen worked with American Methodist William Taylor administering to the needs of the offspring of Indian and European unions. In 1873 he joined the Methodist church. Bowen Memorial Methodist Church of Mumbai was established in his memory in 1889.

Notes

Further reading
 
 A selection of obituaries for George Bowen, 
 

1816 births
1888 deaths
American expatriates in India
American Protestant missionaries
Converts to Methodism
Protestant missionaries in India